Sleepless Nights is a 1979 novel by American novelist and critic Elizabeth Hardwick.

Summary
In Sleepless Nights a woman looks back on her life—the parade of people, the shifting background of place—and assembles a scrapbook of memories, reflections, portraits, letters, wishes, and dreams. The novel contains autobiographical elements.

Reception
Writing for the New York Times, Lauren Groff referred to the book as "[...] brilliant, brittle and strange".

Cultural influence
Sigrid Nunez drew inspiration from the book while writing her novel The Friend.

References

External links
 Publisher’s Homepage for Sleepless Nights

1979 American novels
Novels set in New York City
Autobiographical novels
Random House books